The Sultans were an American rock and roll band led by John Reis, formed in 2000 in San Diego, California and disbanded in January 2007. Over the course of the band's lifespan they released two full-length albums on Reis' Swami Records label. The band took pride in their "stripped down" rock and roll approach, using a simple guitar/bass/drum structure and recording quickly using pre-used equipment and borrowed instruments in order to maintain a loose, spontaneous feel.

Band history

Formation
Sultans essentially began as a "side project" in 2000 while Reis was taking time off from his main band Rocket from the Crypt, who were in between record labels and had lost their longtime drummer Atom Willard. While searching for a new record label and drummer, Reis started his own label Swami Records and experimented with other musicians, resulting in the formation of both the Sultans and Hot Snakes. Sultans resulted from his collaboration with drummer Tony Di Prima. Bringing in Rocket from the Crypt guitarist Andy Stamets, Reis took up the bass guitar and the band recorded an introductory EP and the album Ghost Ship, both of which were released that year on the Swami label. As Reis has a tradition of using different stage names or pseudonyms in his various projects, he chose to perform as "Slasher" in the Sultans, while Stamets performed as "Black Flame."

Touring in support of Ghost Ship was limited due to the members' commitments to their other bands. They were able to play several shows in the San Diego area. Reis also toured sporadically with Hot Snakes at this time before he and Stamets resumed working full-time with Rocket from the Crypt.

Lineup change
In November 2003 Reis and Di Prima reconvened to work on another Sultans album, but Stamets chose not to rejoin the group. Reis took over the guitar position and his younger brother Dean Reis was brought in to play bass, taking the stage name "Black Velvet." This lineup recorded the album Shipwrecked, released in early 2004 on Swami Records. That April the band embarked on the Swami Southwest Seance tour of southern California, featuring other acts also signed to the Swami label. Afterwards John Reis returned to work with Hot Snakes. Over the next year the Sultans would perform sporadically around the San Diego area as Reis' schedule permitted.

Demise
In mid to late 2005 both Hot Snakes and Rocket from the Crypt played their final shows. The breakups of these groups left the Sultans as John Reis' only active band. He devoted himself to running Swami Records, which released several albums by San Diego-area rock bands. In January 2006 the Sultans toured four cities as part of "The Swami California Field Trip," with Rocket from the Crypt/Hot Snakes drummer Mario Rubalcaba replacing Di Prima, who had left the group. The band performed infrequently throughout the rest of the year.

On January 10, 2007 the Sultans played their final performance at the San Diego rock club the Casbah. The event was organized as a benefit for the San Diego-based video production company Fourth Project, who had been working on DVD releases for several of Reis' bands when most of their offices were destroyed by a fire. Reis had announced prior to the show that this would mark the end of the Sultans as an active band, although he would not rule out the possibility of them ever performing together again. Following the band's breakup Reis has taken a break from performing, focusing his energy on running Swami Records, building a recording studio, and taking care of his new child. He has indicated that he will return to music in the near future. Dean Reis, meanwhile, performs with The Heartaches, while Rubalcaba plays in Earthless and is part-owner of the independent record store Thirsty Moon Records in the Hillcrest area of San Diego.  Dean Reis and Mario Rubalcaba also play in the band Spider Fever along with Cody Young of The Widows and Billy Baggins of The Heartaches.

On October 31, 2010 the Sultans played a reunion show at Bar Pink, a San Diego bar co-owned by John Reis, with a lineup of John Reis, Dean Reis, Andy Stamets, and Tony DiPrima.

Band members

Slasher (John Reis) – guitar, lead vocals (played bass from 2000–2003 before switching to guitar)
Black Flame (Andy Stamets) – guitar, backing vocals (2000–2003)
Black Velvet (Dean Reis) – bass, backing vocals (2003–2007)
Tony Di Prima – drums, backing vocals (2000–2006)
Mario Rubalcaba – drums (2006–2007)

Timeline

Discography

Albums

EPs

Non-album Tracks

References

External links
 Sultans at Swami Records
 Swami Records

Rock music groups from California
Swami Records artists
Musical groups from San Diego
Musical groups established in 2000
Musical groups disestablished in 2007